Aýna is a small village and municipality in the southern region of the province of Albacete, in the Spanish autonomous community of Castile-La Mancha. It is a popular summer vacation destination due to its pleasant scenery and climate. It has a population of over 900 inhabitants, which has declined between 1950 and 2000. Aýna is referred to as "Spanish Switzerland" due to its location between two mountain ranges.

Monuments: Main Church, Yedra's Castle
Hotels : Alfonso XIII hotel
Facilities : Pools, supermarkets, banks, rent houses, sport areas...

An archaic name, Aýna has the only Spanish language use of the character ý.

References

External links
Main page of Aýna in Spanish
Tourist website with some information of the village in Spanish

Municipalities of the Province of Albacete